Thyroxine-binding globulin (TBG) is a globulin protein that in humans is encoded by the SERPINA7 gene.  TBG binds thyroid hormones in circulation. It is one of three transport proteins (along with transthyretin and serum albumin) responsible for carrying the thyroid hormones thyroxine (T4) and triiodothyronine (T3) in the bloodstream. Of these three proteins, TBG has the highest affinity for T4 and T3 but is present in the lowest concentration relative to transthyretin and albumin, which also bind T3 and T4 in circulation.  Despite its low concentration, TBG carries the majority of T4 in the blood plasma.  Due to the very low concentration of T4 and T3 in the blood, TBG is rarely more than 25% saturated with its ligand. Unlike transthyretin and albumin, TBG has a single binding site for T4/T3. TBG is synthesized primarily in the liver as a 54-kDa protein. In terms of genomics, TBG is a serpin; however, it has no inhibitory function like many other members of this class of proteins.

Role in diagnosis
Thyroxine-binding globulin tests are sometimes used to find the cause of raised or lowered levels of thyroid hormone. This is done by measuring resin binding to labeled thyroid hormone, which happens only when the labeled thyroid hormone is free.

The patient's serum is mixed with the labeled thyroid hormone; next, the resin is added to the whole mixture to measure the amount of free labeled thyroid hormone.  So, for instance, if the patient is truly hypothyroid, and TBG levels are normal, then there are many sites open for binding on the TBG, since the total thyroid hormone level is low.  Therefore, when the labeled hormone is added, it will bind mostly to the TBG, leaving little of it left for binding to the resin.  In contrast, however, if the patient is truly hyperthyroid, and TBG levels are normal, the patient's endogenous hormone will saturate the TBG binding sites more, leaving less room for the labeled hormone, which allows greater binding to the resin.

In patients who are truly hypo- or hyperthyroid, TBG testing is not very useful.  However, if total thyroid hormone levels point to hypothyroidism or hyperthyroidism in the absence of accompanying symptoms, the utility of TBG testing becomes more evident, since TBG production can be modified by other factors such as estrogen levels, corticosteroid levels, or liver failure.  If, for example, the TBG level is high, which can occur when estrogen levels are high, the TBG will bind more thyroid hormone, decreasing the free hormone available in the blood, which leads to stimulation of TSH, and the production of more thyroid hormone.  In this case, the total thyroid hormone level will be high.  And so, when labeled hormone is added, since TBG is so high, once equilibrium between the binding of endogenous thyroid hormone and the labeled hormone is achieved, less free labeled hormone will be available for uptake into the resin.  On the converse, in the presence of corticosteroids, which lower TBG levels, the total thyroid hormone (bound and free) in the blood will be low.  Thus, when the labeled hormone is added, since so little TBG is available in the blood, after equilibrium is achieved, only a small portion of it will bind, leaving plenty available for uptake by the resin.

Further reading

External links 
 

Blood proteins
Thyroid